Simon Libercsey (also Libercsei) was a Hungarian nobleman, who served as vice-ispán of Hont County in 1437, alongside Francis Hati, when Stephen Aranyi and Blaise Sági simultaneously held the office of ispán in that year. Simon was an early member of the Libercsey family, which originated from Nógrád County and retained its influence mostly in Nógrád and Hont Counties until its extinction in 1670.

References

Sources

 
 

15th-century Hungarian people
Simon